Biniou Diémé-Marizy (born 1 February 1984) is a French-Senegalese basketball player for Saint-Amand Hainaut Basket.

References

External links

Basketlfb

1984 births
Living people
Basketball players at the 2016 Summer Olympics
Citizens of Senegal through descent
French expatriate basketball people in Spain
French sportspeople of Senegalese descent
French women's basketball players
Olympic basketball players of Senegal
Point guards
Senegalese expatriate basketball people in Spain
Senegalese women's basketball players
Sportspeople from Évreux